Michael Russell (10 December 1920 – 12 January 2009) was the Roman Catholic Bishop of Waterford and Lismore in Ireland from 1965 to 1993.

Education and Ordination
Born in Loughmore, Thurles, Co Tipperary, in 1920, Russell was educated at the Christian Brothers School in Thurles, and played minor hurling for Tipperary.

He was sent to study for the priesthood at St Patrick's College, Maynooth and was ordained there on 17 June 1945 for service in the Roman Catholic Archdiocese of Cashel and Emly. He began postgraduate studies and, in 1948, was awarded a doctorate in Canon Law.  In the summer he was appointed to the staff of St. Patrick's College, Thurles where he lectured where he lectured in moral theology. He became vice-president in 1959.

Episcopal Ministry

His appointment as Bishop of Waterford and Lismore was announced by Pope Paul VI on 8 November 1965 in succession to Bishop Daniel Cohalan (bishop of Waterford and Lismore).  Even though Russell was not yet ordained a bishop, he attended the final session of the Second Vatican Council and received episcopal ordination in the Cathedral of the Most Holy Trinity, Waterford, on 19 December 1965.  He took as his episcopal motto 'Humilitate et Lenitate' (humility and gentleness.)

In 1984 the highlight of the trip to Ireland by President Ronald Reagan was a visit to his ancestral home village of Ballyporeen in Russell's Waterford diocese. He, along with every other Catholic bishop invited to similar events, refused to attend and gave no explanation.

At his death he was reported to have been the last surviving Irish bishop who had taken part in the Second Vatican Council.   The same obituary recalled his episcopal ministry in Waterford  "He oversaw the building of many new churches in the expanding suburbs of Waterford city particularly.....he was very committed to the active, social care of his flock, particularly where new community centres and the elderly were concerned. He was also a great supporter the credit unions."

References

1920 births
2009 deaths
People from Thurles
Roman Catholic bishops of Waterford and Lismore
Alumni of St Patrick's College, Maynooth
20th-century Roman Catholic bishops in Ireland